Gaofeng Tujia Ethnic Township is a rural Tujia ethnic township in Cili County, Hunan Province, China.

Administrative divisions
Gaofeng Tujia Ethnic Township is divided into the following 16 administrative villages:

 Sanxi Village
 Shuangxing Village
 Fuya Village
 Kangjiaping Village
 Mao'an Village
 Taoshuping Village
 Nanjing Village
 Yuanyangchi Village
 Gandonghe Village
 Loujiang Village
 Jingyang Village
 Gaofeng Village
 Huashan Village
 Longquan Village
 Xuelian Village
 Kangle Village

References

Divisions of Cili County
Ethnic townships of the People's Republic of China